British American School may refer to:
 British American School, a private, all-grades school offering a bilingual education in Puerto Vallarta, Jalisco, Mexico
 British American School (State of Mexico), a private international school in Naucalpan, part of Greater Mexico City
 British International School of Charlotte, a private, non-sectarian, co-ed college prep school located in Charlotte, North Carolina